Marshall County is a county located in the U.S. state of Illinois. According to the 2010 census, it had a population of 12,640. Its county seat is Lacon.

Marshall County is part of the Peoria, IL Metropolitan Statistical Area.

History
Marshall County was formed in 1839 out of Putnam County. It was named in honor of John Marshall, Chief Justice of the United States Supreme Court, who died in 1835.

Geography
The county is distinctly bisected by the Illinois River, splitting the county into two uneven sections.

Climate and weather

Major highways

  Interstate 39
  U.S. Highway 51
  Illinois Route 17
  Illinois Route 18
  Illinois Route 26
  Illinois Route 29
  Illinois Route 40
  Illinois Route 89
  Illinois Route 117
  Illinois Route 251

Adjacent counties
 Bureau County - northwest
 Putnam County - north
 LaSalle County - east
 Woodford County - south
 Peoria County - southwest
 Stark County - west

National protected area
 Chautauqua National Wildlife Refuge (part)

Demographics

As of the 2010 United States Census, there were 12,640 people, 5,161 households, and 3,549 families living in the county. The racial makeup of the county was 97.1% white, 0.4% Asian, 0.3% black or African American, 0.2% American Indian, 1.1% from other races, and 0.9% from two or more races. Those of Hispanic or Latino origin made up 2.5% of the population. In terms of ancestry, 43.0% were German, 16.7% were Irish, 14.4% were English, 7.2% were Italian, 6.2% were American, and 6.1% were Polish.

Of the 5,161 households, 27.4% had children under the age of 18 living with them, 56.7% were married couples living together, 7.7% had a female householder with no husband present, 31.2% were non-families, and 26.8% of all households were made up of individuals. The average household size was 2.40 and the average family size was 2.88. The median age was 44.8 years.

The median income for a household in the county was $49,116 and the median income for a family was $64,781. Males had a median income of $46,793 versus $28,549 for females. The per capita income for the county was $24,991. About 6.8% of families and 9.5% of the population were below the poverty line, including 11.4% of those under age 18 and 7.0% of those age 65 or over.

Communities

Cities
 Henry
 Lacon
 Toluca
 Wenona

Villages
 Hopewell
 La Rose
 Sparland
 Varna
 Washburn

Unincorporated communities

 Camp Grove
 Hopewell Estates
 La Prairie Center
 Lawn Ridge
 Leeds
 Pattonsburg
 Saratoga Center
 Wilbern

Townships

 Bell Plain
 Bennington
 Evans
 Henry
 Hopewell
 Lacon
 La Prairie
 Richland
 Roberts
 Saratoga
 Steuben
 Whitefield

Politics
In its early days Marshall County was a swing county, voting for winning Whig candidate William Henry Harrison in 1840 but otherwise supporting the Democratic Party until 1852. Its reputation as a swing county was to be sustained with the growth of the Republican Party: it voted for the winning candidate in every election from 1852 to 1912 except 1884 and 1888.

Since World War I, Marshall has generally been a strongly Republican county. Only two Democrats – Franklin D. Roosevelt in 1932 and 1936 plus Lyndon Johnson in 1964 – have gained an absolute majority in Marshall County over the past twenty-six elections, although Bill Clinton won pluralities in both his elections.

See also
 National Register of Historic Places listings in Marshall County, Illinois

References

 
Illinois counties
1839 establishments in Illinois
Peoria metropolitan area, Illinois
Populated places established in 1839